The False Asta Nielsen (German:Die falsche Asta Nielsen) is a 1915 German silent film directed by Urban Gad and starring Asta Nielsen.

Cast
 Asta Nielsen as Die Barbierstochter Bolette  
 Victor Arnold as Der Barbier  
 Fred Immler
 E. Dietsch as The Baron

References

Bibliography
 Jennifer M. Kapczynski & Michael D. Richardson. A New History of German Cinema.

External links

1915 films
Films of the German Empire
Films directed by Urban Gad
German silent short films
German black-and-white films
1910s German films